Carbury (Irish: Cairbre Drumcliabh) is a barony in north County Sligo, Ireland. It corresponds to the ancient túath of Cairbre Drom Cliabh.

Location

The barony is in the north of County Sligo, bordering County Leitrim.

History

References

Baronies of County Sligo